Sam Li (born 4 May 2003), known in China as Li Sirong, is a Chinese footballer who plays as a right-back for Danish side Vejle, on loan from Dutch side ADO Den Haag.

Club career
Born in Dalian, Liaoning, Li started playing football at the age of eight. His mother took him to Spain, Germany, and France, before deciding that the Netherlands would be the best place for her son to pursue a career in football. He moved to the Netherlands at the age of twelve, training with an amateur side for over a year before passing a trial with professional side ADO Den Haag.

In February 2020, he suffered a serious injury to his knee, keeping him out for almost a year. Despite this, he recovered to sign his first professional contract with ADO Den Haag in January 2021, a three-and-a-half year deal.

In January 2023, he was loaned to Danish side Vejle.

Personal life
Li is the son of former Chinese international footballer, and current general manager of Beijing Guoan, Li Ming.

As well as professional football, Li also works as a model, and has worked with French personal care brand L'Oréal. He has also modelled Italian fashion house Bottega Veneta and German brand Puma clothing, both for American men's magazine GQ.

References

External links
 

2003 births
Living people
Chinese male models
Footballers from Dalian
Footballers from Liaoning
Chinese footballers
Association football fullbacks
ADO Den Haag players
Vejle Boldklub players
Chinese expatriate footballers
Chinese expatriate sportspeople in the Netherlands
Expatriate footballers in the Netherlands
Chinese expatriate sportspeople in Denmark
Expatriate footballers in Denmark